Uglješa Marković (born 18 January 1991) is a Serbian politician. He has served in the National Assembly of Serbia since 2020 as a member of the Socialist Party of Serbia (Socijalistička partija Srbije, SPS).

Early life and private career
Marković was born in Belgrade, Republic of Serbia, in what was then the Socialist Federal Republic of Yugoslavia. He was raised in the city and earned a bachelor's degree in economics. In 2017, he began work on a master's degree in the same field.

Politician

Socialist Party
Marković was raised in a family that supported the Socialist Party and became a party member in 2013. He was elected as president of the Socialist Youth of Serbia on 17 December 2017.

In a 2019 interview, he was asked for his opinion of former Serbian president Slobodan Milošević. Marković described Milošević as having emerged as a statesman "at the wrong time, in the wrong place," though adding that his legacy included two landmark accomplishments for Serbia: the Dayton Agreement and United Nations Security Council Resolution 1244.

Municipal politics
Marković received the eighth position on the Socialist Party's electoral list for the Stari Grad municipal assembly in the 2016 Serbian local elections. The list won four mandates in the municipality; he was not immediately elected but received a mandate on 29 September 2016 as the replacement for another party member. He was promoted to the fifth position on the Socialist list in the 2020 local elections and was re-elected when the list won six mandates. He remains a member of the local assembly and has served on the committee for the implementation of Stari Grad's youth policy.

Parliamentarian
Marković was given the fourth position on the Socialist Party's list in the 2020 Serbian parliamentary election. This was tantamount to election, and he was indeed elected when the list won thirty-two mandates. During the campaign, he highlighted the importance of Serbia's public health system established in the socialist era. The SPS continued its participation in Serbia's coalition government after the election, and Marković served with the government's parliamentary majority.

During his first term, Marković was a member of the committee on administrative, budgetary, mandate, and immunity issues; a member of the committee on the economy, regional development, trade, tourism, and energy; a deputy member of the foreign affairs committee; a deputy member of the committee on finance, state budget, and control of public spending; a deputy member of the committee on spatial planning, transport, infrastructure, and telecommunications; the head of Serbia's parliamentary friendship groups with Slovakia and Suriname; and a member of the friendship groups with Albania, Bosnia and Herzegovina, Bulgaria, Burundi, Ghana, the Holy See, Malta, the Netherlands, Romania, Sierra Leone, Sweden, and Tunisia.

He was promoted to the third position on the Socialist Party's list in the 2022 parliamentary election and was re-elected when the list won thirty-one seats. He is now the chair of the spatial planning committee; a member of the foreign affairs committee; a deputy member of the economy committee and the security services control committee; once again the leader of Serbia's parliamentary friendship group with Suriname; and a member of the friendship groups with Belarus, Bosnia and Herzegovina, Bulgaria, the Caribbean countries (Antigua and Barbuda, Barbados, Belize, Dominica, Haiti, St. Lucia, St. Kitts and Nevis), China, Egypt, France, Ireland, Kuwait, Liechtenstein, New Zealand and the Pacific Island countries (Vanuatu, Tuvalu, Fiji, Nauru, Palau, Papua New Guinea, Solomon Islands), Russia, Slovenia, Trinidad and Tobago, and the United Arab Emirates. He was briefly a deputy member of Serbia's delegation to the North Atlantic Treaty Organization (NATO) parliamentary assembly, where Serbia has observer status, in 2022.

He has been appointed as a deputy member of Serbia's delegation to the Parliamentary Assembly of the Council of Europe (PACE). As of January 2023, he has not yet taken his seat.

References

1991 births
Living people
Politicians from Belgrade
Members of the National Assembly (Serbia)
Deputy Members of the NATO Parliamentary Assembly
Socialist Party of Serbia politicians